Nilambur State assembly constituency is one of the 140 state legislative assembly constituencies in Kerala state in southern India. It is also one of the 7 state legislative assembly constituencies included in the Wayanad Lok Sabha constituency. As of the 2021 assembly elections, the current MLA is LDF independent P. V. Anwar.

Local self governed segments
Nilambur Niyama Sabha constituency is composed of the following local self governed segments:

{ "type": "ExternalData",  "service": "geoshape",  "ids": "Q16135735,Q7917616,Q16137500,Q13110666,Q13113507,Q13111977,Q6373625,Q13110048"}

Members of Legislative Assembly
The following list contains all members of Kerala legislative assembly who have represented Nilambur Niyama Sabha Constituency during the period of various assemblies:

Key

    

* Bypoll

Election results
Percentage change (±%) denotes the change in the number of votes from the immediate previous election.

Niyamasabha Election 2016
There were 2,06,132 registered voters in Nilambur Constituency for the 2016 Kerala Niyamasabha Election.

Niyamasabha Election 2011 
There were 1,74,945 registered voters in the constituency for the 2011 election.

See also
 Nilambur
 Malappuram district
 List of constituencies of the Kerala Legislative Assembly
 2016 Kerala Legislative Assembly election

References

External links 
 Remaining Date for Nilambur Municipality Election 2020

Assembly constituencies of Kerala

State assembly constituencies in Malappuram district